Global means of or referring to a globe and may also refer to:

Entertainment
 Global (Paul van Dyk album), 2003
 Global (Bunji Garlin album), 2007
 Global (Humanoid album), 1989
 Global (Todd Rundgren album), 2015
 Bruno J. Global, a character in the anime series The Super Dimension Fortress Macross

Companies and brands

Television
 Global Television Network, in Canada
 Global BC, on-air brand of CHAN-TV, a television station in Vancouver, British Columbia, Canada
 Global Okanagan, on-air brand of CHBC-TV, a television station in Kelowna, British Columbia, Canada
 Global Toronto, a television station in Toronto
 Global Edmonton
 Global Calgary
 Global Montreal
 Global Maritimes
 Canwest Global, former parent company of Global Television Network
 Global TV (Venezuela), a regional channel in Venezuela

Other industries
 Global (cutlery), a Japanese brand
 Global Aviation Holdings, the parent company of World Airways, Inc., and North American Airlines, Inc., headquartered in Peachtree City, Georgia
 Global Media & Entertainment, Media and Entertainment Group in the UK
 Global Industrial, an industrial products and office supplies company in the United States
 Global Records, a Romanian record label
 Global Bio-Chem, a listed biotechnology company in Hong Kong, with Changchun Dacheng Industry Group as its parent company

Other uses
 .global, top-level domain
 Global (TV series), a British TV news programme from BBC
 Global Cebu F.C., a professional Filipino association football club
 Global Affairs Canada, the department in the Government of Canada that manages Canada's diplomatic and consular relations
 Global Agenda, an online team-based game by Hi-Rez Studios
 Global Challenge, a round the world yacht race run by Challenge Business
 Global variable, a variable with global scope

See also
 Global Air (disambiguation)
 Global Vision (disambiguation)
 Globalism, now most commonly used to refer to different ideologies of globalization
 Globalization, ongoing process by which regional economies, societies, and cultures have become integrated
 Globe (disambiguation)
 Intercontinental (disambiguation)
 Worldwide (disambiguation)